Sithara is an alternative to Sitara which in Hindi means "a star". The following are notable people and works with name: 
 Sithara (singer), Indian singer
 Sithara (actress), Indian actress
 Sitara Devi kathak dancer
 Mohan Sithara, Malayalam film music composer
 Sitaara, a 1984 Telugu film
 Sithara, the Hindi TV series Sasural Simar Ka dubbed into Malayalam

See also
 Sitara (disambiguation)